Dr. Walter Pharr Craven House is a historic home located near Charlotte, Mecklenburg County, North Carolina.  The house was built about 1888, and is a two-story, vernacular Victorian style frame dwelling.  It is associated with a small farm that supported the family of a country doctor.  Also on the property are the contributing frame well canopy (1929), family Catholic chapel (c. 1910), central passage barn (c. 1920), log corn crib (c. 1888), tool shed (c. 1920), and auto garage (c. 1920).

It was listed on the National Register of Historic Places in 1991.

References

Houses on the National Register of Historic Places in North Carolina
Victorian architecture in North Carolina
Houses completed in 1888
Houses in Charlotte, North Carolina
National Register of Historic Places in Mecklenburg County, North Carolina